iM1A2 Abrams is a simulation of the M1A2 Abrams main battle tank for the Windows 95 operating system, developed by Charybdis Enterprises, and published by Interactive Magic (also known as Imagic) in 1997. The game was released as a CD-ROM.

Gameplay
iM1A2 Abrams is a simulation focusing on battlefield management as a tank commander controlling an entire company of support vehicles including infantry, artillery, and air strikes as well as the players' own tank platoon(s). Mastering the many company commands, and regular use of the real-time updated tactical map is essential for success. The player also has the ability to "jump" to each crew position (commander, gunner, driver) in every M1A2 vehicle on the battlefield and take control of each directly.

Three separate fictional campaigns are available to play: the Iranian (taking place in Iraq), Bosnian, and Ukrainian. All of the major eastern and western vehicle types were accurately modeled, and a fictional T-95 main battle tank was added to the mix to create more of a challenge for the somewhat superior M1A2 MBT.

Development
The game's head designer was Arnold Hendrick, best known for designing M1 Tank Platoon. To help with the game's authenticity, Hendrick consulted with a number of contacts in General Dynamics and the United States Armed Forces, including a master gunnery sergeant who was actively training Saudis in the use of the MIA2.

Reception 
Publisher Interactive Magic shipped 100,000 copies of the game in preparation for its launch.

Next Generation rated it three stars out of five, and stated that "At times, it feels more like a job than a game.  The designers went for keeping it true to life, and that means authenticity, not adrenaline."

North American distributions of the game included the red black and white "PC Gamer Editor's Choice" sticker. This was one of Interactive Magic's last releases in a line of military simulations. It has been compared to MicroProse's M1 Tank Platoon II over the years, due to many similarities in layout and gameplay.

References

External links
iM1A2 Abrams at MobyGames

1997 video games
Tank simulation video games
Video games developed in the United States
Video games set in Bosnia and Herzegovina
Video games set in Iraq
Video games set in Ukraine
Windows games
Windows-only games
Yugoslav Wars in fiction